Martina Lautenschlager (born 18 July 1988) is a Swiss former professional tennis player.

Lautenschlager played in a doubles rubber for the Switzerland Fed Cup team in 2004, as a member of a young and inexperienced Swiss squad for a tie against Canada in Dorval, Quebec. Switzerland won the tie and Lautenschlager got her opportunity in a doubles dead rubber, partnering Timea Bacsinszky. The pair were beaten in two tiebreak sets by Mélanie Marois and Marie-Ève Pelletier.

While competing on the junior circuit she also played in some professional tournaments and won an ITF doubles title at Lenzerheide in 2005. She left the professional tour in 2006.

ITF finals

Doubles: 1 (1–0)

See also
List of Switzerland Fed Cup team representatives

References

External links
 
 
 

1988 births
Living people
Swiss female tennis players